Sailing competitions at the 2021 Junior Pan American Games in Cali, Colombia, were held from 2 to 4 December 2021.

Medal summary

Medal table

Medalists

References

External links
Sailing at the 2021 Junior Pan American Games

Sailing
Junior Pan American Games
Qualification for the 2023 Pan American Games